SBK: Snowboard Kids, released in Japan as , is a snowboarding video game for the Nintendo DS released on November 2005 in North America and Japan. It was also released in Europe on April 28, 2006. It is the third in the Snowboard Kids series. Up to four people can play wirelessly with one game card.

Characters
The game consists of characters Slash Kamei, Brad Maltinie, Nancy Neil, Jamjars "Jam" Kuehnemund, Koyuki Tanaka, Thomas "Tommy" Parsy, and Max. Jack Frost, mascot of Atlus and demon in the Megami Tensei series, makes an appearance as a hidden character. Black Frost is a more sinister looking version of Jack Frost with better stats.

Linda Maltinie, the character responsible for starting most of the competitions in the previous Snowboard Kids games, is absent and has replaced by Brad.

The characters' super deformed, large-nosed style has been discontinued, and in this game the characters take on an appearance that is much more standard and anime-esque. Some of the characters have undergone drastic personality changes, the two most noticeable being Nancy and Tommy. They were both mild-mannered, nice to everyone and kind but now, have become mean-spirited and even borderline antagonistic.

Reception

SBK: Snowboard Kids received "mixed" reviews according to the review aggregation website Metacritic.

GameSpot praised the game for its lengthy courses and being like an SSX and Mario Kart mix, but criticized it for having less personality than the previous two games in the series. IGN also praised the game for the time trials and the slalom missions, yet criticized it for its lack of focus on real arcade racing balance. Nintendo Power, however, called it "Mario Kart on ice." In Japan, Famitsu gave it a score of one eight, two sevens, and one six for a total of 28 out of 40, while Famitsu Cube + Advance also gave it all four sevens for a total of 28 out of 40.

References

External links
Atlus' SBK: Snowboard Kids official site

2005 video games
Atlus games
Nintendo DS games
Nintendo DS-only games
Snowboarding video games
Video games developed in Japan
Video games scored by Masahiko Hataya
Rising Star Games games
Multiplayer and single-player video games